The Allison Legacy Series is a stock car racing series in the United States. It is based on 3/4 size scaled-down NASCAR Cup Series chassis utilizing a Mazda B-2200 truck engine. The lower-tier series has been used as a stepping stone into higher divisions. The cars were designed in 1996 by NASCAR driver Donnie Allison's sons Donald, Kenny, and Ronald Allison.

History

The series was conceived in 1996 by Donald, Kenny, and Ronald Allison, the sons of former NASCAR driver Donnie Allison. The vehicles were designed to be 3/4 size stock cars. Kenny Allison said that the cars were designed to be decently affordable and have decent maintenance costs yet be a class that fans can relate to. The cars began to compete regularly in 1998 with the formation of a national series. The national touring series is run out of the Allison Brothers shop at Salisbury, North Carolina.  By 2004, eight regional touring series had formed in the United States, including the Maine Legacy Series which had Canadian dates in Quebec and Nova Scotia.

Feature events are typically 50 laps or less.

Vehicle
The series uses a tubular chassis with a fiberglass body. Body styles include a Ford Thunderbird and Chevrolet Monte Carlo. The chassis is powered by a Mazda B2200 2.2-liter engine. The chassis must weigh  (without the driver) and it utilizes  Goodyear tires. As of August 2004, the vehicles were estimated to cost around $16,800 by Stock Car Racing Magazine.

Racing enhancements including an aluminum radiator, adjustable front suspension, aluminum front hubs, a quick-change rear end, steel racing wheels, and coil over shocks and springs. An aluminum racing seat, 5-point harness, and window nets are required for safety.

Drivers
Drivers in the series are part-time, including children who are old enough to have jobs. The series is often used as a development series by Late Model drivers. Drivers who have used the Allison Legacy Series on their way to NASCAR include: Trevor Bayne, Kelly Bires, Erik Darnell, Joey Logano, David Ragan, Regan Smith, and Brian Vickers. Chad McCumbee won the 2001 national championship and rookie of the year; he repeated as champion in the following season. Timmy Hill won the 2009 U.S. national championship after winning ten races.

National championship drivers
1996 Doug Stevens
1997 Blake Bainbridge
1998 Randy Brantley
1999 Regan Smith
2000 Jay Godley
2001 Chad McCumbee
2002 Chad McCumbee
2003 Mark Howard
2004 Derek Lee
2005 Trevor Bayne
2006 Nicholas Pope
2007 Michael Cooper 
2008 Austin Hogue 
2009 Timmy Hill
2010 Justin Allison 
2011 Tyler Hill
2012 John Hunter Nemechek
2013 Justin LaDuke
2014 Devin O'Connell
2015 Jantzen Stirewalt
2016 Justin Taylor
2017 Kyle Campbell
2018 Brett Suggs
2019 Luke Akers

References

External links
 

Stock car racing
Sports competitions in Charlotte, North Carolina